Gobiopsis angustifrons, the nrrownape barbelgoby, is a species of goby found in the Western Central Pacific Ocean from Indonesia, to Australia, and the Solomon Islands.

Size

References

Gobiidae
Taxa named by Ernest A. Lachner
Taxa named by James F. McKinney
Fish described in 1978
Fish of the Pacific Ocean